The Rose of Surrey is a British silent drama film of 1913 directed by Larry Trimble and starring Florence Turner, Frank Powell, Millicent Vernon, and Leal Douglas.

Outline
An attractive widow tries to lure the son of a rich man away from his girl friend.

Cast
Florence Turner as Rose Moore
Frank Powell as Edmund Grey
Shirley Lea as John Grey
Millicent Vernon as Vivienne Hunter
Leal Douglas as Mrs Moore
Arthur Rodney as Solicitor

Notes

External links

1913 films
1913 drama films
British silent feature films
British drama films
Films set in London
British black-and-white films
1910s English-language films
1910s British films
Silent drama films